Abedzadeh is a surname. Notable people with the surname include:

Ahmad Reza Abedzadeh (born 1966), Iranian footballer and manager
Amir Abedzadeh (born 1993), Iranian footballer, son of Ahmad

Persian-language surnames